The Dutch Basketball League's (DBL) steals title is awarded to the player with the highest steals per game average in a given regular season.

Leaders

References

External links
Steals leaders DBL at j-dus.com 

steals